Homeroom is an American sitcom that aired on ABC from September 16, 1989 to December 17, 1989. The series stars stand-up comedian Darryl Sivad as a fourth grade teacher at an inner-city school. ABC executives created the show as a vehicle for Sivad after seeing his routine on The Tonight Show Starring Johnny Carson.

Premise
The series follows Darryl Harper (Sivad), a highly paid advertising copywriter who decides to quit his job to teach underprivileged kids at P.S. 391, an inner city school in New York City. Darryl's wife Virginia (Penny Johnson) supports his choice but Virginia's father, Phil Drexler (Bill Cobbs) does not. Phil frequently voices his disapproval to Darryl that he feels is his right as Darryl and Virginia live rent-free in the brownstone Phil owns and also lives in.

Cast
Darryl Sivad as Darryl Harper
Penny Johnson as Virginia "Vicki" Harper
Bill Cobbs as Phil Drexler
Trent Cameron as Sam
Jahary Bennett as Devon
Billy Dee Willis as Donald

Reception and cancellation
Homeroom premiered on ABC on September 16, 1989 to mixed reviews.  The series was scheduled on Sunday nights opposite CBS's hit series Murder, She Wrote and NBC's My Two Dads. As a result, Homeroom struggled in the ratings and faced cancellation. In an effort to save the series, the cast and producers asked viewers to start a letter writing campaign. Executive producer Topper Carew went on a cross-country promotional tour to schools where he showed the series to students and teachers and held a Q&A session afterwards. Carew also mailed letters and contacted African-American organizations and activists asking them to watch the show and to talk about it. Despite the cast and producers' efforts, ABC canceled the series in December 1989. Three of the thirteen episodes produced were never aired.

Episodes

References

External links
 
 

1989 American television series debuts
1989 American television series endings
1980s American black sitcoms
1980s American school television series
1980s American sitcoms
1980s American workplace comedy television series
American Broadcasting Company original programming
Elementary school television series
English-language television shows
Television series about educators
Television shows set in New York City
Television series by Warner Bros. Television Studios
Television series by Castle Rock Entertainment